À ton image is a 2004 French film directed by Aruna Villiers. The story, based on the 1998 novel À ton image by Louise L. Lambrichs, is about a couple whose desire for a child leads them onto dangerous ground.

Plot
Haunted by painful memories and a terrible feeling of guilt a sterile young woman named Mathilde (played by Nastassja Kinski) uses extreme cloning methods to give birth to Manon (Audrey DeWilder), and is comforted by her obstetrician husband Thomas (Christopher Lambert). Manon starts off as a very normal child but then suffers from intense nightmares, that we later uncover to be her mother's memories. The child's growth is abnormally rapid and she becomes the splitting image of her mother. Manon becomes determined to destroy her mother's life, even showing affection for Mathilde's husband Thomas. Manon eventually learns what happened to her brother who drowned in the well at the back of their property. Gradually, the relation between them evolves in an odd manner as Manon takes over her mother's role in the family.

Cast
 Nastassja Kinski as Mathilde
 Christopher Lambert as Thomas
 Audrey Dewilder as Manon
 Jeanne Buchard as Manon (at the age of 5)
 Francine Bergé as Mathilde's mother
 Rufus (Jacques Narcy) as Mathilde's father
 Andrzej Seweryn as Professeur Cardoze
 Raoul Billerey as the father of Thomas
 Lyes Salem as Antoine
 Christian Hecq as Gaëtan
 Sandra Cheres as Claire
 Isabelle Caubère as the principal
 Paloma Martin Y Prada as the nurse
 Pierre Poirot as the doctor

References

External links

2004 films
Films based on science fiction novels
French thriller films
2000s thriller films
2000s French films